Piero Attorrese (18 June 1930 – 3 June 2021) was an Italian rower. He competed in the men's eight event at the 1952 Summer Olympics.

References

External links
 

1930 births
2021 deaths
Italian male rowers
Olympic rowers of Italy
Rowers at the 1952 Summer Olympics
Place of birth missing